The 1979 European Figure Skating Championships was a senior-level international competition held in Zagreb, Yugoslavia from January 30 to February 4. Elite senior-level figure skaters from European ISU member nations competed for the title of European Champion in the disciplines of men's singles, ladies' singles, pair skating, and ice dancing.

Results

Men

Ladies

Pairs

Ice dancing

References

External links
 results

European Figure Skating Championships, 1979
European Figure Skating Championships, 1979
European Figure Skating Championships
International figure skating competitions hosted by Yugoslavia
Sports competitions in Zagreb
1970s in Zagreb
European Figure Skating Championships
European Figure Skating Championships
European Figure Skating Championships